The Balkan frog (Pelophylax kurtmuelleri) also known as the Balkan water frog and Greek marsh frog) is a species of frog occurring in Greece and, to a lesser extent, in Albania, Montenegro, and Serbia. The species highly resembles Pelophylax ridibundus, from which it was only distinguished in 1991 by bio-acoustic analysis. The separation of the species is not unanimously accepted.

The average length is 72 mm for males, 78 mm for females. The back is green or occasionally brown, often with a light green stripe down the middle, and with darker spots irregularly distributed across the back. The tympanum is bronze or green surrounded by a darker color.

The species is found across Greece except in the northeastern corner, where P. ridibundus is found instead. In Western Greece it lives along with Pelophylax epeiroticus. It occurs from sea level up to 1000 m, though large populations are not found above 600 m. Small introduced populations live in Denmark, Poland and Italy.

External links
 Amphibiaweb.org listing

Pelophylax
Amphibians of Europe
Amphibians described in 1940